Gulzar Khan (died 28 August 2017) was a Pakistani bureaucrat-turned-politician who had been a Member of the National Assembly of Pakistan from June 2013 to August 2017.

Political career

Khan as bureaucrat  served as Deputy Commissioner  of Peshawar, Political Agent for South and North Waziristan and Commissioner for Afghan refugees. He also had been the home secretary for Khyber Pakhtunkhwa and Tribal Affairs Department and chairman of the Khyber Pakhtunkhwa Public Service Commission.

Khan joined Pakistan Tehreek-e-Insaf (PTI) before the 2013 Pakistani general election and was allocated the party ticket to contest the 2013 general election from Constituency NA-4 (Peshawar-IV). He was elected to the National Assembly of Pakistan as a candidate of PTI from Constituency NA-4 (Peshawar-IV) in 2013 general election. He received 55,134 votes and defeated Nasir Khan Mosazai, a candidate of Pakistan Muslim League (N) (PML-N).

In 2014, Khan was elected as a chairman of a group which consisted of 13 PTI's members of the National Assembly who opposed a PTI call to resign from the National Assembly during the Azadi march. He had quit the PTI and stopped attending the party meetings afterwards. In 2014, Imran Khan asked for disqualification of Khan from the membership of the National Assembly for violating party's discipline. However, his National Assembly membership was not revoked after Khan refused to quit his National Assembly seat.

During his tenure as member of the National Assembly, he served as chairman of the National Assembly's Standing Committee on Education, Training and Standards in Higher Education.

He died on 28 August 2017 after suffering from cardiac arrest in his native town, Masho Gogar in Badaber.

References

20th-century births
2017 deaths
Pakistan Tehreek-e-Insaf politicians
Pakistani civil servants
People from Peshawar
Pakistani MNAs 2013–2018
Year of birth missing